Małachowo may refer to the following places:
Małachowo, Greater Poland Voivodeship (west-central Poland)
Małachowo, Masovian Voivodeship (east-central Poland)
Małachowo, Podlaskie Voivodeship (north-east Poland)